Trnavské automobilové závody (TAZ) was an automobile manufacturer in Trnava, Slovakia, that produced cars between 1973 and 1999. When the company folded the manufacturing rights to the van TAZ 1500 (earlier Škoda 1203) was bought by Ocelot Auto. TAZ was one part of the Škoda-Factories. Before the production of the 1203/1500, TAZ was a producer of automobile-parts and home appliances manufacturer.

External links
 
OCELOT Jirouš Roman
Firma Ing. Vladimír MATĚJKA - OCELOT Žacléř

TAZ
Defunct motor vehicle manufacturers of Czechoslovakia
Motor vehicle manufacturers of Czechoslovakia
Defunct motor vehicle manufacturers of Slovakia